Shaukat Galiev (full name Shaukat Galievich Idiyatullin,) 20 November 1928 – 7 May 2011

He was a renowned Tatar poet, writer, and a publisher, widely known for his children's books.

References

Tatar poets
Soviet poets
Russian male poets
Soviet male writers
20th-century male writers
1928 births
2011 deaths